Sara Battaglia (born 14 June 1986) is an Italian female karateka who was World champion at 2006 World Karate Championships.

Battaglia is an athlete of the G.S. Fiamme Oro.

References

External links
 Sara Battaglia at Polizia di Stato

1986 births
Living people
Italian female karateka
Karateka of Fiamme Oro
World Games medalists in karate
World Games bronze medalists
Competitors at the 2013 World Games
Competitors at the 2009 World Games
20th-century Italian women
21st-century Italian women